Brunei, as Brunei Darussalam, had an athlete compete for the first time at the 1996 Summer Olympics in Atlanta, United States. Brunei had previously made its debut at the 1988 Summer Olympics in Seoul when it sent a swimming official, but skipped the 1992 Summer Olympics in Barcelona.

Shooting

References
Official Olympic Reports

Nations at the 1996 Summer Olympics
1996
Olympics